One Manhattan Square (also known as 225 Cherry Street or 252 South Street) is a residential skyscraper project developed by Extell Development Company in the Two Bridges neighborhood of Manhattan, New York City. Built from 2014 to 2019, the project was built on the site of a former Pathmark grocery store, which was demolished in 2014. The building topped out in 2017 and stands out significantly within the context of the neighborhood, at 258 meters in height, the next highest structure being the Manhattan Bridge at roughly 102 meters in height. A 13-story affordable housing component will be located separately on-site from the main tower. The building topped out in September 2017 and was complete by August 2019.

Controversy
The neighborhood's residents immediately reacted to the closing of the old Pathmark supermarket, claiming that gentrification would prevent them from being able to buy affordable groceries. Once the Pathmark closed, other markets in the neighborhood became more expensive.

Other residents of the area opposed the project because the tower would be out of context with the rest of the vicinity. Its design has also been compared to a cheese grater. In fact, Extell Development Company initially proposed a tower of 68 stories or 800 feet at the site in 2014, but later reduced the scale of the tower structure to 56 stories or 700 feet. Concerns are over the transit infrastructure not being able to support such a development. However, the building wound up topping out at 72 stories.

Additionally, several dozen area residents organized into a protest in April 2015 claiming the project made unequal the future residents of the affordable housing portion and those residing in the luxury tower. Some claimed the separation of the affordable portion, restricted to a 13-story structure, acted as a "poor door" for the overall development.

References

External links

1 Manhattan Square
Residential buildings completed in 2019
Residential condominiums in New York City
Lower East Side